JCSS is an acronym that may refer to

 Japan Calibration Service System
 Jesus Christ Superstar - a musical and film adaptation
 Journal of Computer and System Sciences
Joint Committee on Structural Safety